Abu Bakr (c. 573–August 23, 634/13 AH) was the first Muslim ruler after Muhammad (632–634). Sunnis regard him as rightful successor (caliph), the first of four righteous Caliphs (Rashidun).

Family tree

Descendants

See also 
Succession to Muhammad, Rashidun
Abu Bakr – Family tree
Umar – Family tree
Uthman – Family tree
Ali – Family tree

References

Further reading
Armstrong, Karen. Muhammad: Biography of the Prophet, Phoenix, 1991.

External links 
Abu Bakr's character
Hazrat Abu Bakr Siddiq (R)

Abu Bakr
Ancient Arabs
Abu Bakr
 Tree
Abu Bakr